James Taranto (born January 6, 1966) is an American journalist. He is editorial features editor for The Wall Street Journal, in charge of the newspaper's op-ed pages, both print and digital.
He was formerly editor of its online editorial page OpinionJournal.com.
He joined the newspaper's editorial board in 2007.

Before joining the Wall Street Journal in 1996, Taranto spent five years as an editor at City Journal. He has also worked for The Heritage Foundation and Reason magazine.
He pursued a degree in journalism at California State University, Northridge (CSUN) but "never bothered to graduate" after "conflict with teachers and professors".

Rooster incident
While attending CSUN, Taranto worked as news editor and also as one of two opinion page editors for the Daily Sundial student newspaper. On March 5, 1987, Taranto published an opinion piece criticizing a controversy at the University of California, Los Angeles, in which the editor of the Daily Bruin student newspaper was suspended after the paper published a comic strip depicting a rooster admitted to the university via affirmative action. Accompanying Taranto's column was a reprint of the rooster cartoon. Journalism professor and Daily Sundial publisher Cynthia Rawitch suspended Taranto for two weeks without pay. Acting on Taranto's behalf, the American Civil Liberties Union Foundation of Southern California filed suit against Rawitch and other members of the CSUN journalism school. The suit was settled before trial on terms favorable to Taranto and the ACLU.

Best of the Web Today
Under Taranto, Best of the Web Today was a column published weekday afternoons on WSJ.com. It began as an
anonymous web column collecting interesting links. (The title and the use of the editorial "we" come from that era.) Within a year it became a bylined column with commentary as well as links.
Many of the items came from suggestions by readers, and each column ends with thanks to those who contributed to it.
In his final column, Taranto announced that the Best of the Web Today feature would return with another editorial writer taking the reins.

Aurora mass shooting controversy 
On July 25, 2012, Taranto sparked outrage online by posting the following comment to his Twitter account, in reference to the victims and survivors of the 2012 Aurora, Colorado shooting: "I hope the girls whose boyfriends died to save them were worthy of the sacrifice".

Later that day, Taranto issued a mea culpa in his Best of the Web Today entry.

References

External links 

 James Taranto's own homepage
 Taranto's Best of the Web Today column
 James Taranto's biography at OpinionJournal.com
 

American columnists
California State University, Northridge alumni
The Wall Street Journal people
1966 births
Living people